The Royal Naval Air Service (RNAS) was the air arm of the Royal Navy, under the direction of the Admiralty's Air Department, and existed formally from 1 July 1914 to 1 April 1918, when it was merged with the British Army's Royal Flying Corps to form the Royal Air Force (RAF), the world's first independent air force.

It was replaced by the Fleet Air Arm, initially consisting of those RAF units that normally operated from ships, but emerging as a separate unit similar to the original RNAS by the time of World War 2.

Background 
In 1908, the British Government recognised the military potential of aircraft. The Prime Minister, H. H. Asquith, approved the formation of an "Advisory Committee for Aeronautics" and an "Aerial Sub-Committee of the Committee of Imperial Defence". Both committees were composed of politicians, army officers and Royal Navy officers. On 21 July 1908 Captain Reginald Bacon, who was a member of the Aerial Navigation sub-committee, submitted to the First Sea Lord Sir John Fisher that a rigid airship based on the German Zeppelin be designed and constructed by the firm of Vickers. After much discussion on the Committee of Imperial Defence the suggestion was approved on 7 May 1909. The airship, named Mayfly, never flew and broke in half on 24 September 1911. The then First Sea Lord, Sir Arthur Wilson, recommended that rigid airship construction be abandoned.

On 21 June 1910, Lt. George Cyril Colmore became the first qualified pilot in the Royal Navy. After completing training, which Colmore paid for out of his own pocket, he was issued with Royal Aero Club Certificate Number 15.

In November 1910, the Royal Aero Club, thanks to one of its members, Francis McClean, offered the Royal Navy two aircraft with which to train its first pilots. The club also offered its members as instructors and the use of its airfield at Eastchurch on the Isle of Sheppey. The Admiralty accepted and on 6 December the Commander-in-Chief, The Nore promulgated the scheme to the officers under his jurisdiction and requested that applicants be unmarried and able to pay the membership fees of the Royal Aero Club. The airfield became the Naval Flying School, Eastchurch. Two hundred applications were received, and four were accepted: Lieutenant C. R. Samson, Lieutenant A. M. Longmore, Lieutenant A. Gregory and Captain E. L. Gerrard, RMLI.

History 

After prolonged discussion on the Committee of Imperial Defence, the Royal Flying Corps was constituted by Royal Warrant on 13 April 1912. It absorbed the nascent naval air detachment and also the Air Battalion of the Royal Engineers. It consisted of two wings with the Military Wing making up the Army element and Naval Wing, under Commander C. R. Samson. A Central Flying School staffed by officers and men of both the navy and the army was created at Upavon for the pilot training of both wings, and opened on 19 June 1912 under the command of Captain Godfrey Paine, a naval officer. The Naval Wing, by the terms of its inception was permitted to carry out experimentation at its flying school at Eastchurch. The Royal Flying Corps, although formed of two separate branches, allowed for direct entry to either branch through a joint Special Reserve of Officers, although soon the Navy inducted new entries into the Royal Naval Reserve. In the summer of 1912, in recognition of the air branch's expansion, Captain Murray Sueter was appointed Director of the newly formed Air Department at the Admiralty. Sueter's remit as outlined in September 1912 stated that he was responsible to the Admiralty for "all matters connected with the Naval Air Service."

In the same month as the Air Department was set up, four naval seaplanes participated in Army Manoeuvres. In 1913 a seaplane base on the Isle of Grain and an airship base at Kingsnorth were approved for construction. The same year provision was made in the naval estimates for eight airfields to be constructed, and for the first time aircraft participated in manoeuvres with the Royal Navy, using the converted cruiser  as a seaplane carrier. On 16 April ten officers of the Navy Service graduated from the Central Flying School. As of 7 June 44 officers and 105 other ranks had been trained at the Central Flying School and at Eastchurch, and 35 officers and men had been trained in airship work. Three non-rigid airships built for the army, the Willows, Astra-Torres and the Parseval were taken over by the navy. On 1 July 1914, the Admiralty made the Royal Naval Air Service, forming the Naval Wing of the Royal Flying Corps, part of the Military Branch of the Royal Navy. Promotions to the rank were first gazetted on 30 June 1914.

First World War 

By the outbreak of the First World War in August 1914, the RNAS had 93 aircraft, six airships, two balloons and 727 personnel. The Navy maintained twelve airship stations around the coast of Britain from Longside, Aberdeenshire, in the northeast to Anglesey in the west. On 1 August 1915 the Royal Naval Air Service officially came under the control of the Royal Navy. In addition to seaplanes, carrier-borne aircraft, and other aircraft with a legitimate "naval" application the RNAS also maintained several crack fighter squadrons on the Western Front, as well as allocating scarce resources to an independent strategic bombing force at a time when such operations were highly speculative. Inter-service rivalry even affected aircraft procurement. Urgently required Sopwith 1½ Strutter two-seaters had to be transferred from the planned RNAS strategic bombing force to RFC squadrons on the Western Front because the Sopwith firm were contracted to supply the RNAS exclusively. This situation continued, although most of Sopwith's post-1915 products were not designed specifically as naval aircraft. Thus RNAS fighter squadrons obtained Sopwith Pup fighters months before the RFC, and then replaced these first with Sopwith Triplanes and then Camels while the hard-pressed RFC squadrons soldiered on with their obsolescent Pups.

On 23 June 1917, after the Second Battle of Gaza, RNAS aircraft attacked Tulkarm in the Judean Hills.

On 1 April 1918, the RNAS was merged with the RFC to form the Royal Air Force.

At the time of the merger, the Navy's air service had 55,066 officers and men, 2,949 aircraft, 103 airships and 126 coastal stations.

The RNAS squadrons were absorbed into the new structure, individual squadrons receiving new squadron numbers by effectively adding 200 to the number so No. 1 Squadron RNAS (a famous fighter squadron) became No. 201 Squadron RAF.

The Royal Navy regained its own air service in 1937, when the Fleet Air Arm of the Royal Air Force (covering carrier borne aircraft, but not the seaplanes and maritime reconnaissance aircraft of Coastal Command) was returned to Admiralty control and renamed the Naval Air Branch. In 1952, the service returned to its pre-1937 name of the Fleet Air Arm.

Roles and missions 

The main "naval" roles of the RNAS (ignoring for the minute the service's direct field "support" of the RFC) were fleet reconnaissance, patrolling coasts for enemy ships and submarines, and attacking enemy coastal territory. The RNAS systematically searched  of the Channel, the North Sea and the vicinity of the Strait of Gibraltar for U-boats. In 1917 alone, they sighted 175 U-boats and attacked 107. Because of the technology of the time the attacks were not very successful in terms of submarines sunk, but the sightings greatly assisted the Navy's surface fleets in combatting the enemy submarines.

It was the RNAS which provided much of the mobile cover using armoured cars, during the withdrawal from Antwerp to the Yser, in 1914 (see RNAS Armoured Car Section below). Later in the war, squadrons of the RNAS were sent to France to directly support the RFC. The RNAS was also at one stage entrusted with the air defence of London. This led to its raids on airship stations in Germany, in places as far from the sea as the manufacturing site at Friedrichshafen.

Before techniques were developed for taking off and landing on ships, the RNAS had to use seaplanes in order to operate at sea. Beginning with experiments on the old cruiser , special seaplane tenders were developed to support these aircraft. It was from these ships that a raid on Zeppelin bases at Cuxhaven, Nordholz Airbase and Wilhelmshaven was launched on Christmas Day of 1914. This was the first attack by British ship-borne aircraft; the first ship-borne aircraft raid was launched by the Japanese seaplane carrier Wakamiya on 6 September. A chain of coastal air stations was also constructed. This was followed with the Tondern raid, again against Zeppelins, which was the first instance of carrier launched aircraft.

Notable personnel 

 John Alcock – aviation pioneer
 Henry Allingham – mechanic – oldest man in the world from June to July 2009 and the last surviving member of the RNAS
 Richard Bell-Davies – 3 Squadron – awarded the Victoria Cross
 Noel Pemberton Billing – aviator, inventor, publisher and Member of Parliament.
 Norman Blackburn – aviation pioneer and joint managing director of Blackburn Aircraft
 Henry John Lawrence Botterell – Naval 8 – longest surviving First World War fighter pilot (he died 3 January 2003 at age 106)
 Frederick Bowhill – Squadron commander in Wing 2, later Commander-in-chief Transport Command RAF. Air Chief Marshal
 Arthur Roy Brown – Naval 9 – ace, officially credited with shooting down the Red Baron (although this is now generally discredited)
 Egbert Cadbury – credited with shooting down two Zeppelin over the North Sea
 Arnold Jacques Chadwick – DSC – Naval 4 ace on two types of aircraft: Sopwith Pup and Sopwith Camel
 Erskine Childers – author of The Riddle of the Sands and famous Irish republican, later executed by the Irish Free State for his service in the Anti-Treaty IRA. Father of Erskine Childers, fourth President of Ireland.
 Raymond Collishaw – Naval 10 – top RNAS ace, with 60 victories
 Roderic Dallas – Commanding Officer of No. 1 Squadron RNAS, ace with over 32 victories.
 David Grahame Donald – International rugby player and Air Marshall
 Grahame Donald – Aviator at Jutland
 Christopher Draper – 3 Wing 6 Naval, Naval 8 – "The Mad Major"
 Sir William Dickson – the only RNAS junior officer to later serve as either Chief of the Air Staff or Chief of the Defence Staff
 Walter Dicketts - MI5 British double agent "CELERY" 1941-1943
 Stanley Goble – commanded No. 5 Squadron, ace with ten victories, was awarded the Distinguished Service Order and the Distinguished Service Cross, later to become Chief of the Air Staff of the Royal Australian Air Force
 Claude Grahame White – aviation pioneer
Tommy Handley – comedian, mainly known for the BBC radio programme It's That Man Again ("ITMA").
 Hugh Grosvenor, 2nd Duke of Westminster – held rank of Temporary Commander RNVR while commanding 2 Squadron, RNACS
 Robert Marsland Groves – Officer Commanding No. 1 Squadron RNAS
 Bert Hinkler – Australian aviation pioneer
 Robert Leckie – Canadian pilot who became an Air Marshal in the Royal Canadian Air Force
 Robert A. Little – Australia's top scoring ace of the First World War, with 47 victories
 Oliver Locker-Lampson – Conservative Member of Parliament, commanded 15 Squadron (armoured cars) and led the Russian Armoured Car Division
 Arthur Longmore – early Naval aviator, Officer Commanding No. 3 Squadron RNAS, and Officer Commanding No. 1 Squadron RNAS
 Archie Low – British aeronautics pioneer and early flying instructor. Designer of the Vickers F.B.5. and Vickers E.F.B.1..
 Anthony Jacques Mantle – awarded the Distinguished Flying Cross for services over Turkey
 Robert McCance – later Professor of Experimental Medicine, Cambridge University
 Francis McClean – Irish civil engineer and pioneer aviator
Francis McLaren – Liberal MP, youngest son of Lord Aberconway
 Edwin Moon – aviation pioneer, awarded the DSO. Forced landing in East Africa, led to capture by German forces
 Ivor Novello – entertainer
 Richard Peirse – later Air Chief Marshal Sir Richard Peirse, KCB, DSO, AFC, AOC Palestine/Trans Jordan 1933–36, C-in-C Bomber Command 1940–42, C-in-C RAF India 1942–44, C-in-C SEAC air forces from creation until 1944.
 John Cyril Porte – aviation pioneer and aircraft designer, Station Commander Hendon Aerodrome and RNAS Felixstowe.
 Charles Rumney Samson – initial commandant of the RFC Naval Wing, led the first armoured car units on the Western Front, later Air Officer Commanding RAF units in the Mediterranean
 William Forbes-Sempill, 19th Lord Sempill – air pioneer
 Alexander MacDonald Shook – flying ace of Naval 4 and recipient of the Distinguished Service Order, Distinguished Service Cross, Air Force Cross and Croix de Guerre
 Edward Maitland – aviation pioneer, Officer Commanding the Captive Balloon Detachment
 Edgar Middleton – playwright and author
 Ivan Stedeford – industrialist
 Murray Sueter – pioneer of naval aviation
 Sir Frederick Sykes – initial commander of RFC Military Wing, officer commanding RNAS at Gallipoli & later, controller-general of Civil Aviation and Governor of Bombay
 Adrian Tonks – flying ace of Naval 4, winner of two Distinguished Flying Crosses
 Taunton Elliott Viney – credited with bombing a U Boat off Middelkerke and was awarded the D.S.O.
 Barnes Wallis – engineer, designer of the R9 and R80 airships, famed for the bouncing bomb
 Reginald Alexander John Warneford – awarded the Victoria Cross
 Josiah Wedgwood – awarded the D.S.O., commanded the machine guns on the SS River Clyde
 John Weston – South Africa's first aviator. First World War service in France, Eastern Mediterranean (Mudros, Lemnos) and with British Naval Mission to Greece 
 James White – Naval 8 – ace
 Tony Wilding – New Zealand World number 1 tennis player for 1912 and 1913; later an RNACD armoured car commander, killed on the Western Front in 1915

Naval vessels 

 , a light cruiser converted into a seaplane carrier. Sunk by German U-boat U-27 on 31 October 1914.
The first three ships each carrying three seaplanes were the "striking force" of the first naval air attack, the raid on Cuxhaven on 25 December 1914. HMS Vindex had a take-off ramp fitted and was the first operational ship to launch a wheeled aircraft.
 , a fast Isle of Man ferry converted to a seaplane carrier that served in the Gallipoli Campaign. Ben-My-Chree supplied the aircraft that made the first successful aerial torpedo attack against ships. A Short seaplane flown by Flt Cdr C. H. K. Edmonds carried a 14-inch torpedo between the floats which was dropped from a height of 15 feet, hitting and sinking a Turkish ship. Ben-my-Chree was sunk by Turkish artillery in 1917, but without loss of life.
  also served at Gallipoli, and continued service after 1918. She was renamed Pegasus in 1934, to release the name for the new modern aircraft carrier .
  was an ex-Cunard liner. Although she was much larger than those before her, the 120 foot take-off ramp was not sufficient for wheeled aircraft to take off.
 , a converted tramp steamer equipped with the Navy's first kite balloon observation platform for gunnery spotting during the Dardanelles campaign.
 , a converted passenger ship with a take-off ramp. 
 , a converted battle cruiser, with an 18-inch gun aft and a flying-off deck forward. She was rebuilt as a through-deck carrier after 1918 and served in World War II.
 , laid down as the Italian liner Conte Rosso in 1914, was completed as a carrier with a full flight deck in September 1918.

RNAS Armoured Car Section 

The RNAS engaged in interservice rivalry on land as well as in the air, possessing for a time the UK's only mechanised land forces in the form of the RNAS Armoured Car Section made up of squadrons of Rolls-Royce Armoured Cars. Commanded by Commander Charles Samson, the section was originally equipped with unarmoured touring cars and intended to provide line of communications security and to pick up aircrew who had been forced to land in hostile territory. Samson saw the possibilities when he armed one vehicle with a Maxim gun and ambushed a German car near Cassel on 4 September 1914. He then had a shipbuilders in Dunkirk add boilerplate to his Rolls-Royce and Mercedes vehicles. The new armoured car squadrons were soon used to great effect forming part of Naval mechanised raiding columns against the Germans. By November 1914 the Section had become the Royal Naval Armoured Car Division (RNACD) eventually expanding to 20 squadrons. As trench warfare developed, the armoured cars could no longer operate on the Western Front and were redeployed to other theatres including the Middle East, Romania and Russia. In the summer of 1915 the RNACD was disbanded and the army took over control of armoured cars, with the units soon coming under the command of the Motor Branch of the Machine Gun Corps.

However RNAS experience of the Western Front would not be lost, No. 20 Squadron RNAS was retained under Naval control to further develop armoured vehicles for land battle, these personnel later becoming the nucleus of the team working under the Landship Committee that developed the first tanks.

The RAF later inherited some ex-RNAS armoured cars left in the Middle East, and during the Second World War, the Number 1 Armoured Car Company RAF played an important role in the defence of RAF Habbaniya when the base was attacked by Iraqi nationalists.

Bases and stations 

Scotland
 Caldale, Orkney
 Cromarty, Ross & Cromarty
 East Fortune, East Lothian
 Houghton Bay, Orkney
 Loch Doon, Ayrshire
 Longside, Aberdeenshire
 Scapa Flow, Orkney
 RAF Turnhouse, Edinburgh

Wales
 Fishguard, Pembrokeshire

France
 Dunkirk
 Saint-Pol-sur-Mer
 La Bellevue
 Vendôme

Eastern Mediterranean
 Imbros, Turkey
 Moudros, Greece
 Stravos
 Thasos, Greece

Elsewhere
 Durban, South Africa
 Otranto, Italy
 Malta
 Mombasa, Kenya

Organisations 
Unlike the RFC, the RNAS was organised on a non-central basis so there were several No 1 Squadrons. Even wings numbers were not consistently given to the same unit, so there are many exceptions in historic data.

At the start of the war there were three wings 1, 2 and 3. As the war progressed, other wings were formed.

 Wing 1 was on both sides of the English Channel in 1914.
 Wings 2 and 3 were sent to the Dardanelles for the Gallipoli Campaign, but Wing 3 was disbanded when the campaign finished and was absorbed into Wing 2 for service in Salonika.
 Wing 3 was reformed in 1916 for strategic bombing, disbanded in 1917.
 Wings 4 and 5 were expanded from Wing 1, the former being fighters and the latter having bombing duties.
 Wing 6 was formed for patrolling the Adriatic Sea, but was expanded to Malta by 1918.

Squadrons serving in France were given numbers from 1 to 17. At the formation of the Royal Air Force on 1 April 1918, they became 201 to 217 squadrons of the RAF.

Squadrons serving in the Eastern Mediterranean were given letters (A to G, and Z).

In 1918, Squadron A became Squadron 222; Squadron B became Squadron 223; Squadron C became Squadron 220; and Squadron D became Squadron 221, all of the RAF. Squadron Z was transferred to the Royal Greek Navy.

Ranks

Officer ranks 
In the RNAS both pilots and observers held appointments as well as their normal Royal Navy ranks, and wore insignia appropriate to the appointment instead of the rank. The insignia consisted of standard Royal Navy cuff stripes corresponding to their normal ranks, surmounted by an eagle (for pilots) or a winged letter "O" (for observers). In addition, Squadron Commanders and Squadron Observers with less than eight years' seniority had their insignia surmounted by two eight-pointed stars, one above the other, while Flight Commanders and Flight Observers had their insignia surmounted by one such star.

After the RNAS merged with the Royal Flying Corps to form the Royal Air Force in 1918, the RNAS pilot appointments became the basis of certain RAF officer ranks, most notably Wing Commander and Flight Lieutenant.

Other ranks 

The following grades were introduced for other ranks in the RNAS and were announced in the London Gazette in 1914.

See also 
 List of aircraft of the Royal Naval Air Service
 Number 2 Armoured Car Company RAF
 :Category:Royal Naval Air Service aviators

Footnotes

Notes

References

External links 

 Armoured Cars in Action by Peter Lewis, Rolls-Royce Owner, Issue No.1, October 1963 

 
Military units and formations established in 1914
Military units and formations disestablished in 1918
1914 establishments in the United Kingdom
Disbanded air forces